The 1863 Texas gubernatorial election was held on November 2, 1863 to elect the governor of Texas. Incumbent Governor Francis Lubbock did not run for a second term. The election was won by Pendleton Murrah, who received 56% of the vote.

The election was the second of two held in Texas during the American Civil War. Texas was, at the time, a Confederate state.

Results

References

1863
Texas
Gubernatorial
November 1863 events